Pardaliparus is a genus of birds in the tit family. The members of the genus were formerly included in Parus but were moved to Pardaliparus when Parus was split into several resurrected genera following the publication of a detailed molecular phylogenetic analysis in 2013.

The genus contains the following species:

The yellow-bellied tit inhabits China and the other two species inhabit the Philippines.

References

 Gill, Frank B.; Slikas, Beth; and Sheldon, Frederick H. (2005): Phylogeny of titmice (Paridae): II. Species relationships based on sequences of the mitochondrial cytochrome-b gene. Auk 122: 121–143. DOI: 10.1642/0004-8038(2005)122[0121:POTPIS]2.0.CO;2 HTML abstract

 
Paridae
 
Bird genera